The George Wallace Show was an Australian television series which aired in 1960. Starring George Wallace Jnr, it was a variety series aired in a daytime time-slot on Sydney station TCN-9. Aired at 2:00PM, it aired against Your Home on ATN-7, while ABN-2 did not offer any programming until 2:30PM.

Little information is available on this series. George Wallace Jr, who was the son of very popular Australian comedian George Wallace, later was a regular on the Brisbane-produced series Theatre Royal, and was a popular comedian in his own right.

See also 
 List of Australian television series
 The Contact Show
 Theatre Royal

References

External links
The George Wallace Show on IMDb

1960 Australian television series debuts
1960 Australian television series endings
Black-and-white Australian television shows
Australian variety television shows